The United Pentecostal Church International (UPCI) is a Oneness Pentecostal denomination headquartered in Weldon Spring, Missouri, United States. The United Pentecostal Church International was formed in 1945 by a merger of the former Pentecostal Church, Inc. and the Pentecostal Assemblies of Jesus Christ. The United Pentecostal Church International began with 521 churches and has grown, according to their own figures, to more than 42,000 churches (including daughter works and preaching points), 40,000 credentialed ministers, and a total worldwide constituency of over 5.5 million. The international fellowship of United Pentecostals consists of national organizations that are united as the Global Council of the UPCI, which is chaired by the general superintendent of the UPCI, currently David K. Bernard.

History
The United Pentecostal Church International emerged from the Pentecostal movement, which traces its origins to the teachings of Charles Parham in Topeka, Kansas, and the Azusa Street Revival led by William J. Seymour in 1906. The UPCI traces its organizational roots to 1916, when a large group of Pentecostal ministers within the Assemblies of God USA began to unite around the teaching of the oneness of God and water baptism in the name of Jesus Christ. Several Oneness ministers met in Eureka Springs, Arkansas, and on January 2, 1917, formed a Oneness Pentecostal organization called the General Assembly of the Apostolic Assemblies.

The General Assembly of the Apostolic Assemblies merged with another church, the Pentecostal Assemblies of the World (PAW), and accepted the leadership of G. T. Haywood, an African American. This group held the first meeting in Eureka Springs in 1918. This interracial organization adopted the PAW name and remained the only Oneness Pentecostal body until late 1924. Southern Jim Crow laws and racial hatred resulted in many white leaders withdrawing from the PAW rather than remaining under African American leadership. Many local congregations in the Southern U.S., however, remained integrated while attempting to comply with local segregation laws.

In 1925, three new Oneness churches were formed: the Apostolic Churches of Jesus Christ, the Pentecostal Ministerial Alliance, and Emmanuel's Church in Jesus Christ. In 1927, steps were taken toward reunifying these organizations. Meeting in a joint convention in Guthrie, Oklahoma, Emmanuel's Church in Jesus Christ and the Apostolic Churches of Jesus Christ merged, taking the name the Apostolic Church of Jesus Christ. This merger united about 400 Oneness Pentecostal ministers. In 1931, a unity conference with representatives from four Oneness organizations met in Columbus, Ohio attempting to bring all Oneness Pentecostals together. The Pentecostal Ministerial Alliance voted to merge with the Apostolic Church of Jesus Christ, but the terms of the proposed merger were rejected by that body. Nevertheless, a union between the Apostolic Church of Jesus Christ and the PAW was consummated in November 1931. The new body retained the name of the Pentecostal Assemblies of the World.

In 1932, the Pentecostal Ministerial Alliance changed its name to the Pentecostal Church, Incorporated to reflect its organizational structure. In 1936, Pentecostal Church, Incorporated ministers voted to work toward an amalgamation with the Pentecostal Assemblies of Jesus Christ. Final union, however, proved elusive until 1945 when these two Oneness Pentecostal organizations combined to form the United Pentecostal Church International. The merger of these two Oneness Pentecostal bodies brought together 521 churches.

In the U.S. and Canada, the newly formed United Pentecostal Church International traditionally reflected the surrounding demographics, with the majority of its constituency being White and Anglo-American. In the last quarter of the twentieth century, however, the United Pentecostal Church International attempted to shift its doctrines toward the inclusion of every race and culture in North America. In 2008, the United Pentecostal Church International published a statement against racism. Despite attempts to reconcile with minorities, several congregations have left the United Pentecostal Church International citing persistent racism.

Beliefs 
The UPCI's theology is consistent with that of Oneness Pentecostalism. They reject the Trinity and instead believe that the Father, Son, and Holy Spirit are different manifestations of God, as opposed to separate persons. The UPCI believes that one must repent, be baptized "in the name of Jesus" (as opposed to "in the name of the Father, Son, and Holy Spirit"), and receive the Holy Ghost with the evidence of speaking in tongues to be saved, as outlined in Acts 2:38.

Ministers at all levels of the UPCI are allowed to marry and have children. The UPCI considers homosexuality to be contrary to biblical teaching and consequently opposes homosexual acts and homosexual marriage. The UPCI has stated, however, that it affirms the worth and dignity of every human being and opposes bigotry and hatred.

Organization
The basic governmental structure of the UPCI is congregational at the local church level and presbyterian at higher organizational levels. Local churches are self-governing, electing their own pastors and other leaders, owning their own property, deciding their own budgets, establishing their membership, and conducting all necessary local business. The central organization embraces a modified presbyterian system: ministers meet in sectional, district, and general conferences to elect officers and to conduct the church's affairs. The annual General Conference is the highest authority in the UPCI, with power to determine articles of faith, elect officers, and determine policy. A General Superintendent is elected to preside over the church as a whole. On October 1, 2009, David K. Bernard was announced as the new General Superintendent.

According to their own statistics, the UPCI grew from 521 member churches in 1945 to 4,853 churches (including daughter works and preaching points), 11,267 ministers, and a total constituency of 819,764 in the United States and Canada in 2022. Outside the U.S. and Canada, the UPCI has 37,669 churches and preaching points, 28,681 licensed ministers, and a constituency of 4.7 million in 197 nations and 39 territories. The international fellowship consists of national organizations that are united as the Global Council of the UPCI, which is chaired by the general superintendent of the UPCI, David K. Bernard. Total worldwide membership, including North America, is at more than 5.5 million.

General Conference
The General Conference of the United Pentecostal Church International is an annual conference occurring yearly since 1945. It is the highest governing body of the UPCI. Attendees of the conference conduct business, receive training, network with colleagues, participate in worship sessions, and raise funds for various ministries.

Educational institutions

The UPCI operates one seminary accredited by the Association of Theological Schools, Urshan Graduate School of Theology, which was granted the status of Accreditation by the Higher Learning Commission on June 25, 2020.
Urshan Graduate School of Theology in Wentzville, Missouri

The UPCI also operates one Christian liberal arts college accredited by the Association of Theological Schools, Urshan College, which was granted the status of Accreditation by the Higher Learning Commission on June 25, 2020. The college was established in October 2011, when the UPCI General Board approved a plan for Urshan Graduate School of Theology to acquire Gateway College (a college formerly run by the UPCI's Missouri District) to establish Urshan College as a new Christian liberal arts college. The transition was completed on July 1, 2012.
Urshan College in Wentzville, Missouri (formerly Gateway College of Evangelism)

In addition, the UPCI endorses several unaccredited bible colleges:
Apostolic Bible Institute in St. Paul, Minnesota
Centro Teológico Ministerial in Pasadena, Texas
Christian Service Training Institute in San Diego, California (also offering online distance learning, with satellite campuses in California, Georgia, and Florida)
Indiana Bible College in Indianapolis, Indiana
Northeast Christian College in Fredericton, New Brunswick, Canada
North Texas Christian College in Euless, Texas
Texas Bible College in Lufkin, Texas
Purpose Institute based in Canton, Ohio (see Campus Directory)

Currently, there are only two accredited colleges endorsed by the UPCI:
Christian Life College, in Stockton, California
Urshan College, in St. Louis, Missouri

North American Youth Congress

North American Youth Congress (NAYC) is a church gathering primarily for the youth of the UPCI, held biennially since 1979 in various locations around North America. NAYC has been described as one of the largest, if not the largest, gathering of Christian Youth in the US. In 2019, NAYC was held at The Dome at America's Center in St. Louis, Missouri from July 31 to August 2, 2019. The event was one of the largest to date with over 36,000 youths attending. NAYC 2021 was scheduled to be held at Lucas Oil Stadium in Indianapolis, Indiana from July 28 to July 30, 2021, but was canceled as an in-person event on March 29, 2021, due to the COVID-19 pandemic.

Notes and references

Further reading
Bernard, David. The New Birth.
Bernard, David. The Oneness of God.
French, Talmadge. Our God is One.
Norris, David S. I AM: A Oneness Pentecostal Theology.

External links
Official website of the United Pentecostal Church

 
Fundamentalist denominations
Nontrinitarian denominations
Oneness Pentecostal denominations
Pentecostal denominations established in the 20th century
Pentecostal denominations in North America
Pentecostalism in Missouri
Christian organizations established in 1945
Holiness denominations